Vikki RPM is an American telenovela produced by Somos Productions for Nickelodeon Latin America. The series was presented in Natpe as Fórmula A. It is an original idea by Eduardo Jiménez-Pons, written by Catharina Ledeboer and Rocio Lara. It premiered on July 31, 2017, and it stars Samantha Siqueros, Stefano Ollivier, Isabella Castillo, Scarlet Gruber and Leo Deluglio. The series revolves around Victoria (Samantha Siqueros) a young girl with a dream of becoming a great pilot of Formula 1.

Cast

Main 
 Samantha Siqueros as Victoria "Vikki" Franco
 Stefano Ollivier as Max Legrand
 Leo Deluglio as Iker Borges
 Scarlet Gruber as Kira Rivera
 Isabella Castillo as Roxana "Rox" Cruz
 Andrés Mercado as Matías Ocampo
 Gabriel Tarantini as Fede Toledo
 Angela Rincón as Penny
 Angelo Valotia as Oliver
 Vanessa Blandón as Emily Santos
 Saúl Lisazo como Turbo Bonetti

Recurring 
 Maite Embil as Romina Bonetti
 Yul Bürkle as Graco Rivera
 Ana Karina Manco as Jacqueline Rivera
 Paulo Quevedo as Dider Legrand
 María Gabriela de Faría as Francesca Ortíz
 Jose Galindo as Profesor General

Series overview

References 

Spanish-language telenovelas
Nickelodeon telenovelas
Teen telenovelas
Spanish-language Nickelodeon original programming
2017 American television series debuts
2017 telenovelas
American telenovelas
Television series about teenagers
2017 American television series endings